St. Mary's Church of the Purification in Marystown, Minnesota, United States, is a stone church building completed in 1882. The spire was finished in 1883, bringing the total cost of the new church to $8,246.62.

References

External links
 
 Shakopee Catholic Community, consisting of the Church of St. Mark, Church of St. Mary, and Saint Mary of the Purification

Buildings and structures in Scott County, Minnesota
Churches in the Roman Catholic Archdiocese of Saint Paul and Minneapolis
Churches on the National Register of Historic Places in Minnesota
National Register of Historic Places in Scott County, Minnesota
Roman Catholic churches completed in 1882